ASSA can refer to:
 Academy of the Social Sciences in Australia
 Allied Social Science Associations
 Armed Services Security Agency, UK
 Assa Abloy - Swedish manufacturer of locks and security doors
 Astronomical Society of South Australia
 Astronomical Society of Southern Africa
 Austrian Solar and Space Agency
Assa (ethnic group)